Broken Barriers is a 1924 American silent drama film starring James Kirkwood, Norma Shearer, and Adolphe Menjou. Directed by Reginald Barker, the film is based upon the novel of the same name by Meredith Nicholson.

Plot
Grace Durland (Shearer) is a young debutante who is forced to leave college when her father goes bankrupt. While working for a living, she falls in love with Ward Trenton (Kirkwood) who is married. As she reveals her love for a married man to her family, the reaction is very negative. Ward's evil wife refuses to grant him a divorce. This changes when he is injured in a car accident.

Cast
 James Kirkwood as Ward Trenton
 Norma Shearer as Grace Durland
 Adolphe Menjou as Tommy Kemp
 Mae Busch as Irene Kirby
 George Fawcett as Mr. Durland
 Margaret McWade as Mrs. Durland
 Robert Agnew as Bobbie Durland
 Ruth Stonehouse as Ethel Durland
 Robert Frazer as John Moore
 Winifred Bryson as Mrs. Ward Trenton
 Vera Reynolds as Sadie Denton
 Edythe Chapman as Beulah Reynolds
 George Kuwa as Chang

Preservation
With no copies of Broken Barriers located in any film archives, it is a lost film.

References

External links

1924 films
1924 drama films
Silent American drama films
American silent feature films
American black-and-white films
Films based on American novels
Films directed by Reginald Barker
Metro-Goldwyn-Mayer films
1920s American films